Wicker Park may mean:

Wicker Park (film), a 2004 film directed by Paul McGuigan
Wicker Park (soundtrack), the accompanying film soundtrack
Wicker Park, Chicago, a neighborhood in the West Town community area outside of the Chicago Loop
Wicker Park (Chicago park), an urban park in the Wicker Park neighborhood outside of Chicago's West Town